Garra vittatula is a species of ray-finned fish in the genus Garra from Myanmar.

References 

Garra
Fish described in 2004